Tiruvettakkudi Sundareshwarar Temple( திருவேட்டக்குடி சுந்தரேசுவரர் கோயில்
])is a Hindu temple located at Tiruvettakudi in Pondicherry, India. The presiding deity is Shiva. He is called as Sundareshwarar. His consort is known as 
Shantha Nayaki.

Significance 

It is one of the shrines of the 275 Paadal Petra Sthalams - Shiva Sthalams glorified in the early medieval Tevaram poems by Tamil Saivite Nayanar Tirugnanasambandar.

Literary mention 
Tirugnanasambandar describes the feature of the deity as:

References

External links 
 
 

Hindu temples in Puducherry
Padal Petra Stalam